Robert Emmett Honan (born 24 January 1944) is an Australian former rugby union and rugby league footballer who played in the 1960s and 1970s - a dual code rugby international.

Background
Honan was born in Brisbane, Queensland, Australia.

Rugby career

He represented the Wallabies in two Tests on the 1964 tour of New Zealand and played in the centres. His brother Barry was also a Wallaby representative.

Rugby league career

After switching codes he was selected to the Australia national rugby league team on the 1969 tour of New Zealand playing two Tests as a winger. His rugby league international debut in the first Test in Auckland in June 1969 saw him become Australia's 31st dual code rugby international, following Kevin Ryan and preceding Phil Hawthorne and John Brass.

Bob Honan's rugby league club career was as a centre with the South Sydney Rabbitohs from 1967-1972 and 1975. He played in the premiership winning Souths sides of 1968 and 1970 and in the 1969 Grand Final loss to Balmain.

Playing record
 Club: South Sydney Rabbitohs 84 first grade games (105 all grades), 27 tries (35 all grades), 6 field goals (9 all grades), 93 points (123 all grades).
 Representative: Australia (1969) 2 Tests.

References
 Whiticker, Alan  & Hudson, Glen (2006) The Encyclopedia of Rugby League Players, Gavin Allen Publishing, Sydney
 Andrews, Malcolm (2006) The ABC of Rugby League Austn Broadcasting Corpn, Sydney
 Haddan, Steve (2007) The Finals - 100 Years of National Rugby League Finals, Steve Haddan Publishing, Brisbane

External links

1944 births
Australia international rugby union players
Australia national rugby league team players
Australian rugby league players
Australian rugby union players
Dual-code rugby internationals
Living people
South Sydney Rabbitohs players
Rugby league players from Brisbane
Rugby union players from Brisbane
Rugby union centres